Georgia participated in the Eurovision Song Contest 2018 with the song "For You" written by Davit Malazonia, Mikheil Mdinaradze and Irina Sanikidze. The song was performed by the Ethno-Jazz Band Iriao, which was internally selected in December 2017 by the Georgian broadcaster Georgian Public Broadcaster (GPB) to compete at the 2018 contest in Lisbon, Portugal. The Georgian entry, "For You", was presented to the public on 13 March 2018.

Georgia was drawn to compete in the second semi-final of the Eurovision Song Contest which took place on 10 May 2018. Performing during the show in position 10, "For You" was not announced among the top 10 entries of the second semi-final and therefore did not qualify to compete in the final. It was later revealed that Georgia placed eighteenth (last) out of the 18 participating countries in the semi-final with 24 points.

Background

Prior to the 2018 contest, Georgia had participated in the Eurovision Song Contest ten times since their first entry in 2007. The nation's highest placing in the contest, to this point, has been ninth place, which was achieved on two occasions: in 2010 with the song "Shine" performed by Sofia Nizharadze and in 2011 with the song "One More Day" performed by Eldrine. The nation briefly withdrew from the contest in 2009 after the European Broadcasting Union (EBU) rejected the Georgian entry, "We Don't Wanna Put In", for perceived political references to Vladimir Putin who was the Russian Prime Minister at the time. The withdrawal and fallout was tied to tense relations between Georgia and then host country Russia, which stemmed from the 2008 Russo-Georgian War. Georgia had, to this point, failed to qualify to the final on three occasions. In , Georgia failed to qualify to the final with the song "Keep the Faith" performed by Tamara Gachechiladze.

The Georgian national broadcaster, Georgian Public Broadcaster (GPB), broadcasts the event within Georgia and organises the selection process for the nation's entry. GPB confirmed their intentions to participate at the 2018 Eurovision Song Contest on 2 October 2017. Georgia has selected their entry for the Eurovision Song Contest both through national finals and internal selections in the past. In 2017, the Georgian entry was selected via a national final. For their 2018 participation, GPB opted to internally select the Georgian entry.

Before Eurovision

Internal selection 
On 31 December 2017, the broadcaster announced that they had internally selected the band Iriao to represent Georgia in Lisbon. GPB also announced that the music director of the band Davit Malazonia would create their song. The song "For You", composed by Davit Malazonia and Mikheil Mdinaradze with lyrics by Irina Sanikidze, premiered on 13 March 2018 together with the music video on the GPB First Channel's YouTube channel. The music video was filmed at the First Cosmic Object in Saguramo and was directed by Zaza Orashvili. "For You" was the first song performed entirely in the Georgian language that was selected to represent Georgia at the Eurovision Song Contest.

Promotion 
Prior to the contest, Ethno-Jazz Band Iriao specifically promoted "For You" as the Georgian Eurovision entry between 8 and 11 April 2018 by taking part in promotional activities in Tel Aviv, Israel and performing during the Israel Calling event held at the Rabin Square.

At Eurovision 
According to Eurovision rules, all nations with the exceptions of the host country and the "Big Five" (France, Germany, Italy, Spain and the United Kingdom) are required to qualify from one of two semi-finals in order to compete for the final; the top ten countries from each semi-final progress to the final. The European Broadcasting Union (EBU) split up the competing countries into six different pots based on voting patterns from previous contests, with countries with favourable voting histories put into the same pot. On 29 January 2018, a special allocation draw was held which placed each country into one of the two semi-finals, as well as which half of the show they would perform in. Georgia was placed into the second semi-final, to be held on 10 May 2018, and was scheduled to perform in the second half of the show.

Once all the competing songs for the 2018 contest had been released, the running order for the semi-finals was decided by the shows' producers rather than through another draw, so that similar songs were not placed next to each other. Georgia was set to perform in position 10, following the entry from Australia and before the entry from Poland.

The two semi-finals and the final were broadcast in Georgia on GPB First Channel with commentary by Demetre Ergemlidze. The Georgian spokesperson, who announced the top 12-point score awarded by the Georgian jury during the final, was 2017 Georgian Eurovision entrant Tamara Gachechiladze.

Semi-final 

Ethno-Jazz Band Iriao took part in technical rehearsals on 2 and 5 May, followed by dress rehearsals on 9 and 10 May. This included the jury show on 9 May where the professional juries of each country watched and voted on the competing entries.

The Georgian performance featured the members of Ethno-Jazz Band Iriao dressed in black and dark blue suits with the stage colours transitioning from blue to red. The performance began with the three vocalists of the band spread out across the stage, all of them which later formed a line with the remaining two members at the left and right hand sides of the stage playing the keyboard and guitar, respectively, and performed arm choreography after switching positions. The performance also featured smoke effects and a pyrotechnic waterfall. The staging director for the Georgian performance was Zaza Orashvili.

At the end of the show, Georgia was not announced among the top 10 entries in the second semi-final and therefore failed to qualify to compete in the final. It was later revealed that Georgia placed eighteenth (last) in the semi-final, receiving a total of 24 points: 13 points from the televoting and 11 points from the juries.

Voting
Voting during the three shows involved each country awarding two sets of points from 1-8, 10 and 12: one from their professional jury and the other from televoting. Each nation's jury consisted of five music industry professionals who are citizens of the country they represent, with their names published before the contest to ensure transparency. This jury judged each entry based on: vocal capacity; the stage performance; the song's composition and originality; and the overall impression by the act. In addition, no member of a national jury was permitted to be related in any way to any of the competing acts in such a way that they cannot vote impartially and independently. The individual rankings of each jury member as well as the nation's televoting results were released shortly after the grand final.

Below is a breakdown of points awarded to Georgia and awarded by Georgia in the second semi-final and grand final of the contest, and the breakdown of the jury voting and televoting conducted during the two shows:

Points awarded to Georgia

Points awarded by Georgia

Detailed voting results
The following members comprised the Georgian jury:
 David Evgenidze (jury chairperson)composer, musician (jury member in semi-final 2)
 Zurab Ramishvilijazz musician
 Eliso Shengeliamusical producer
 singer
 Kakhaber Grigalashvilisinger
 Mariko Ebralidzesinger, represented Georgia in the 2014 contest (jury member in the final)

References 

2018
Countries in the Eurovision Song Contest 2018
Eurovision